Nogawan is a small town on Bassi-Morinda road, about 6 km from Bassi Pathana. It is a fast-growing town and proudly houses a Senior Secondary School, Petrol Pump, Gurudwara, Flour Mill, Post Office, Railway station, Telephone Exchange, Bus Stand, veterinary hospital and a Dispensary.

Importance 
This town serves as a transportation hub and shopping centre for various villages around it, like:

 Kishanpur 
 Fatehpur Jattan 
 Thablan 
 Gandhuan Kalan
 Shadipur 
 Alampur
 Rampur kaleran 
 Wazidpur
 Karimpura
 Khantt

The main profession of people is Agriculture.  The popular Bhakhra Canal runs just one km away from it, and a small tributary from this canal serves as irrigation needs of this town and surrounding villages.

Cities and towns in Fatehgarh Sahib district